Thanha Rathi Ranga (Between Yesterday and Tomorrow) is a 2014 Sri Lankan Sinhala drama thriller film directed by Nilendra Deshapriya, in his directorial debut, and produced by Sunil T. Fernando for Sunil T. Films.

It was written by Sarath Kothalawala and Kumara Thirimadura and features themselves in lead roles with Namal Jayasinghe. The film also supported by many veteran artists like Swarna Mallawarachchi, Anoja Weerasinghe, Neeta Fernando and Kamal Addararachchi. It is the 1113rd Sri Lankan film in the Sinhala cinema.

The film was an official entry at the Julien Dubuque International Film Festival in the United States.

Plot 
This story revolves around three friends, Sirithunga (Sarath Kothalawala) a handyman and father of three young children, Wimal (Kumara Thirimadura) a three-wheeler driver, and Suraj (Namal Jayasinghe) an overly sensitive university student. The three friends decide following the end of the Sri Lankan Civil War to take a road trip, to areas where the final battles were fought. They each dream of a better life, a future with freedom, love and money.

Cast 
 Kumara Thirimadura as Wimal
 Sarath Kothalawala as Sirithunga
 Namal Jayasinghe as Suraj
 Vishwajith Gunasekara as Wimal's Uncle
 Sulochana Weerasinghe as Jacintha
 Kamal Addararachchi as Chandare
 Adam Adamlly as Peter
 Swarna Mallawarachchi as Manorani
 Anoja Weerasinghe as Wimal's Mother
 Nita Fernando as Chandare's Mother
 Sarath Chandrasiri

Awards 
2015 SIGNIS Film Awards
 Creative Direction Silver Award - Nilendra Deshapriya

2016 Derana Sunsilk Film Awards
 'Best Film' - Nilendra Deshapriya.
 'Best Actor' - Sarath Kothalawala.
 'Best Screenplay' - Sarath Kothalawala, Kumara Thirimadura.
 'Best Cinematography' - Dhanushka Gunathilake.
 'Best Editing' - Ravindra Guruge
 'Best Costumes' - Methnuwan Wijesinghe, Niluka Vanigaratne.
 'Best Supporting Actress' - Sulochana Weerasinghe.
 'Best Makeup' - Narada Thotagamuwa.
 'Best Original Music Score' - Gayathri Khemadasa, Anupama Khemadasa

Box office
The film easily passed 50 days of screening.

References

External links 
 Thanha Rathi Ranga  : Internet Movie Database
 https://www.facebook.com/ThanhaRathiRangaMovie/?fref=ts
 ඔබ නැරැඹිය යුතුම චිත්‍රපටයක් සිනමා සංධ්වනියක්
 ‘තණ්හා රතී රඟා’ ඇසුරෙන් සිනමාව යළි කියවීම

2014 films
2010s Sinhala-language films
2014 thriller drama films
Sri Lankan thriller drama films
2014 drama films